The 2010 Oceania Junior Athletics Championships were held at the Barlow Park in Cairns, Australia, between September 23–25, 2010.  They were held together with the 2010 Oceania Open Championships.
A total of 33 events were contested, 15 by men and 18 by women.

Medal summary
Complete results can be found on the Oceania Athletics Association, and on the World Junior Athletics History webpages.

Boys under 20 (Junior)

Girls under 20 (Junior)

Medal table (unofficial)

Participation (unofficial)
An unofficial count yields the number of about 113 athletes from 20 countries:

 (12)
 (3)
 (5)
 (3)
 (7)
 (4)
 (2)
 (6)
/ (3)
 (21)
 (6)
 (2)
 (5)
 (5)
 (13)
 (3)
 (4)
 (4)
 (2)
 (3)

References

Oceania Junior Athletics Championships
International athletics competitions hosted by Australia
2010 in athletics (track and field)
2010 in Australian sport
Youth sport in Australia
2010 in youth sport